William or Bill Laird is the name of:
Bill Laird (ice hockey) (1891–1953), Canadian ice hockey goalkeeper
William Laird (shipbuilder) (1780–1841), Scottish shipbuilder and entrepreneur who founded the Cammell Laird shipyard at Birkenhead, England
William Laird (Canadian politician) (1835–1911), politician on Prince Edward Island, Canada
William Laird III (1916–1974), United States Senator from West Virginia
William Laird IV (born 1952), former member of the West Virginia House of Delegates and West Virginia Senate
William Laird (footballer), Scottish footballer for Sunderland